Hotel Astoria may refer to:
 Hotel Astoria, Brussels, Belgium
 Astoria Palace Hotel, Rio de Janeiro, Brazil
 Hotel Astoria (Copenhagen), Denmark
 Danubius Hotel Astoria, Budapest, Hungary
 Astoria Hotel, Satu Mare, Romania
 Hotel Astoria (Saint Petersburg), Russia
 Hotel Astoria (Belgrade), Serbia
 Hotel Astoria (Oregon), Astoria, Oregon, United States – later renamed the John Jacob Astor Hotel